The Avon School District is the school district of Avon, Massachusetts, United States. It has two schools, Ralph D. Butler Elementary School and Avon Middle-High School.

In 1993, 142 students living in Brockton attended school in the Avon School District as part of a voluntary school choice program of the State of Massachusetts. 22 were previously students in parochial or private schools and never attended Brockton Public Schools (BPS) schools, so the move of those students did not result in lower costs of fewer students of BPS but only resulted in fewer state aid dollars for BPS. By 1993, under the first year the voluntary school choice program, BPS lost almost $222,000 of state aid funds to the Avon district. BPS expected to lose $286,000 in state aid funds in 1993.

References

External links

 Avon School District

School districts in Massachusetts
Education in Norfolk County, Massachusetts